The Australian women's national under-20 soccer team represents Australia in international women's under-20 soccer. The team is controlled by the governing body for soccer in Australia, Football Federation Australia (FFA), which is currently a member of the Asian Football Confederation (AFC) and the regional ASEAN Football Federation (AFF) since leaving the Oceania Football Confederation (OFC) in 2006. The team's official nickname is the Young Matildas.

History

Coaching staff

Players

Current squad
The following 23 players were called up to the 2024 AFC U-20 Women's Asian Cup qualification first round matches against Guam and Kyrgyzstan. Held in Bishkek, Kyrgyzstan between March 6th and 10th. 

Caps and goals are current as of 10 March 2023 after the match against Kyrgyzstan.

Recent call-ups
The following players were called up to the squad within the last 12 months and still remain eligible for selection.

Notes:
 TOP Train-on or Shadow player.

Recent results and fixtures

2022
Since the qualifying competition for the U-20 Women's World Cup was cancelled, the AFC nominated three teams based on the results of the 2019 AFC U-19 Women's Championship, with Japan, South Korea and North Korea qualifying. After the withdrawal of North Korea, it was announced that Australia would replace North Korea as the AFC's representatives at the FIFA U-20 Women's World Cup. Australia were drawn into the same group as the hosts, for the official Opening Match of the competition.

2023

Competitive record

FIFA U-20 Women's World Cup

OFC U-20 Women's Qualifying Tournament

AFC U-19 Women's Championship

AFF Women's Championship

Honours
OFC Women's U-20 Qualifying Tournament
Winners: 2002, 2004

AFC U-19 Women's Championship
Third place: 2006

Notes

References

External links
 FFA Young Matildas website

Asian women's national under-20 association football teams
National youth sports teams of Australia